This is a list of FIPS 10-4 region codes, using a standardized name format, and cross-linking to articles. The list is broken up into alphabetical sections.

ABC – DEF – GHI – JKL – MNO – PQR – STU – VWXYZ

On September 2, 2008, FIPS 10-4 was one of ten standards withdrawn by NIST as a Federal Information Processing Standard.  It is to be a neutral replacement for ISO 3166.

See also 
 List of FIPS country codes
 ISO 3166-2
 Nomenclature of Territorial Units for Statistics (NUTS)
 Canadian Location Code, the Canadian equivalent, in weather forecasting and emergency alerts

Sources
 FIPS 10-4 Codes and history
 Last version of codes
 All codes (include earlier versions)
 Table to see the evolution of the codes over time
 Administrative Divisions of Countries ("Statoids"), Statoids.com

References

Country subdivision codes
Lists of abbreviations
Region codes